Amritsar, historically also known as Rāmdāspur  and colloquially as Ambarsar, is the second largest city in the Indian state of Punjab, after Ludhiana. It is a major cultural, transportation and economic centre, located in the Majha region of Punjab. The city is the administrative headquarters of the Amritsar district.

According to the United Nations, as of 2018, Amritsar is the second-most populous city in Punjab and the most populous metropolitan region in the state with a population of roughly 2 million. Amritsar is the centre of the Amritsar Metropolitan Region. 

According to the 2011 census, the population of Amritsar was 1,989,961. It is one of the ten Municipal Corporations in the state, and Karamjit Singh Rintu is the current Mayor of the city.

Amritsar is the economic capital of Punjab. It is a major tourist centre with nearly a hundred thousand daily visitors. The city has been chosen as one of the heritage cities for HRIDAY scheme of the Government of India. Amritsar is home to Sri Harmandir Sahib, popularly known as "the Golden Temple", one of Sikhism religion's most spiritually significant and most-visited gurudwaras. The city is also known for Amritsari food, its wooden chessboards and chess pieces manufacturing industry.

Mythology
The Bhagwan Valmiki Tirath Sthal situated at Amritsar is believed to be the Ashram site of Maharishi Valmiki, the writer of Ramayana. As per the Ramayana, Sita gave birth to Lava and Kusha, sons of lord Rama at Ramtirath ashram. Large number of people visit Ramtirath Temple at annual fair. Nearby cities to Amritsar, Lahore and Kasur were believed to be founded by Lava and Kusha, respectively. It is believed that During Ashvamedha Yajna by Lord Rama, Lava and Kush caught the ritual horse and tied Lord Hanuman to a tree near to today's Durgiana Temple.

History

Founding of Amritsar City

Guru Ram Das, the fourth Sikh guru is credited with founding the holy city of Amritsar in the Sikh tradition. Two versions of stories exist regarding the land where Guru Ram Das Ji settled. In one based on a Gazetteer record, the land was purchased with Sikh donations, for 700 rupees from the owners  of the village of Tung.

According to the historical Sikh records, the site was chosen by Guru Amar Das and called Guru Da Chakk, after he had asked Ram Das to find land to start a new town with a man-made pool as its central point. After his coronation in 1574, and the hostile opposition he faced from the sons of Guru Amar Das, Guru Ram Das ji founded the town named after him as "Ramdaspur". He started by completing the pool, and building his new official Guru centre and home next to it. He invited merchants and artisans from other parts of India to settle into the new town with him. The town expanded during the time of Guru Arjan Dev ji financed by donations and constructed by voluntary work. The town grew to become the city of Amritsar, and the pool area grew into a temple complex after his son built the gurdwara Harmandir Sahib, and installed the scripture of Sikhism inside the new temple in 1604.

The construction activity between 1574 and 1604 is described in Mahima Prakash Vartak, a semi-historical Sikh hagiography text likely composed in 1741, and the earliest known document dealing with the lives of all the ten Gurus.

In 1762 and 1766–1767, Ahmad Shah of the Durrani Empire invaded the Sikh Confederacy, besieged Amritsar, massacred the populace and destroyed the city.

Old walled city

During Sikh Empire in 1822 Maharaja Ranjit Singh fortified the city starting from a wall at Katra Maha Singh area. Later, Sher Singh continued with the construction of the wall with twelve gates (Lahori Darwaza, Khazana, Hakeema, Rangar Nangalia, Gilwali, Ramgarhia, Doburji, Ahluwalia, Deori Kalan, Rambagh Deori, Shahzada and Lohgarh) in it and a fort named Dhoor Kot that had fortification 25 yards broad and 7 yards high. The circumference of the walled city was around five miles. When in 1849, British annexed Punjab, Amritsar was a walled city and they built a thirteenth gate to it known as Hall Gate.

Jallianwala Bagh massacre

The Jallianwala Bagh massacre, involving the killings of hundreds of Indian civilians on the orders of British Colonel Reginald Edward Harry Dyer, took place on 13 April 1919 in the heart of Amritsar, the holiest city of the Sikhs, on a day sacred to them as the birth anniversary of the Khalsa (Vaisakhi day).

In Punjab, during World War I (1914–18), there was considerable unrest particularly among the Sikhs, first on account of the demolition of a boundary wall of Gurdwara Rakab Ganj at New Delhi and later because of the activities and trials of the Ghadarites, almost all of whom were Sikhs. In India as a whole, too, there had been a spurt in political activity mainly owing to the emergence of two leaders: Mahatma Gandhi (1869–1948) who after a period of struggle against the British in South Africa, had returned to India in January 1915, and Annie Besant (1847–1933), head of the Theosophical Society of India, who on 11 April 1916 established the Home Rule League with autonomy for India as its goal. In December 1916, the Indian National Congress, at its annual session held at Lucknow, passed a resolution asking the king to issue a proclamation announcing that it is the "aim and intention of British policy to confer self-government on India at an early date".

On 10 April 1919, Satya Pal and Saifuddin Kitchlew, two popular proponents of the Satyagraha movement led by Gandhi, were called to the deputy commissioner's residence, arrested and sent off by car to Dharamsetla, a hill town, now in Himachal Pradesh. This led to a general strike in Amritsar. Excited groups of citizens soon merged into a crowd of about 50,000 marchings on to protest to the deputy commissioner against the arrest of the two leaders. The crowd, however, was stopped and fired upon near the railway foot-bridge. According to the official version, the number of those killed was 12 and of those wounded between 20 and 30. Evidence before an inquiry of the Indian National Congress put the number of the dead between 20 and 30.

Three days later, on 13 April, the traditional festival of Baisakhi, thousands of Hindus, Sikhs and Muslims gathered in the Jallianwala Bagh. An hour after the meeting began as scheduled at 16:30, Dyer arrived with a group of sixty-five Gurkha soldiers (from the 9th Gorkha Rifles) and twenty-five Baluchi soldiers (from the 59th Scinde Rifles). Without warning the crowd to disperse, Dyer blocked the main exits and ordered his troops to begin shooting toward the densest sections of the crowd; the firing continued for approximately ten minutes. A British government inquiry into the massacre placed the death toll at 379. The Indian National Congress, on the other hand, estimated that approximately 1,000 people were killed.

Operation Blue Star
 
Operation Blue Star (1 – 6 June 1984) was an Indian military operation ordered by Indira Gandhi, the Prime Minister of India to curb and remove Sikh militants from the Golden Temple in Amritsar. The operation was carried out by Indian army troops with tanks and armoured vehicles. Militarily successful, the operation aroused immense controversy, and the government's justification for the timing and style of the attack are hotly debated. Operation Blue Star was included in the Top 10 Political Disgraces by India Today magazine.

Official reports put the number of deaths among the Indian army at 83, with 493 civilians and Sikh militants killed. While independent estimates place the numbers upwards of 5,000 people, a majority of them pilgrims, including women and children. In addition, the CBI is considered responsible for seizing historical artefacts and manuscripts in the Sikh Reference Library before burning it down.
 Four months after the operation, on 31 October 1984, Indira Gandhi was assassinated by two of her Sikh bodyguards in what is viewed as an act of vengeance. Following her assassination, more than 17,000 Sikhs were killed in the 1984 anti-Sikh riots.

Geography
Amritsar is located in the Majha region of the state of Punjab in North India lies about 15 miles (25 km) east of the border with Pakistan. Administrative towns includes Ajnala, Attari, Beas, Budha Theh, Chheharta Sahib, Jandiala Guru, Majitha, Rajasansi, Ramdass, Rayya, Verka Town and Baba Bakala.

Climate
Typically for Northwestern India, Amritsar has a hot semi-arid climate (Köppen BSh) bordering on a monsoon-influenced humid subtropical climate (Cwa). The official weather station for the city is the civil aerodrome at Rajasansi. Weather records here date back to 15 November 1947.

Demographics

 2011 census, Amritsar municipality had a population of 1,132,761 and the urban agglomeration had a population of 1,183,705. The municipality had a sex ratio of 879 females per 1,000 males and 9.7% of the population were under six years old. Effective literacy was 85.27%; male literacy was 88.09% and female literacy was 82.09%. The scheduled caste population is 28.8%

Religion

According to 2011 Census of India, Hinduism is the main religion of the Amritsar city at 49.5% of the population, followed by Sikhism (47.9%), Christianity (1.2%), and Islam (0.5%). Around 0.9% of the population of the city stated 'No Particular Religion' or other religion.

Amritsar is the holiest city in Sikhism and about 80 million people visit it each year for pilgrimage.

Politics

The city is part of the Amritsar (Lok Sabha constituency).

Tourism

 
 Golden Temple and Heritage Street 
Durgiana Mandir and Bada Hanuman Mandir 
Mata Lal Devi Mandir, Model Town 
Shri Ram Tirath and Valmiki Tirath 
Shivala Bagh Bhaiyan 
 Punjab State War Heroes' Memorial & Museum
 Sadda Pind
 Urban Haat Food Street
 Gobindgarh Fort
 Ram Bagh Palace and 
Maharaja Ranjit Singh Museum
 Wagah border
 Gurudwara Shaheed Ganj Sahib
 Partition Museum
 Jallianwala Bagh
 Pul Kanjri
 VR Ambarsar, Circular Road.
Mall of Amritsar, near Hyatt
Jang-e-Azadi Memorial near Kartarpur, India

Economy 

Amritsar is the second-largest city and district of Punjab. It is also one of the fastest-growing cities of Punjab. In the mid-1980s the city was famous for its textile industry. Amritsar’s trade and industry faced a blow during militancy period in 1980s, but there are still many textile mills, knitting units and embroidery factories functional in the city. It is famous for its pashmina shawls, woolen clothes, blankets, etc. Among handicrafts, the craft of the Thatheras of Jandiala Guru in Amritsar district got enlisted on UNESCO's List of Intangible Cultural Heritage in 2014, and the effort to revive this craft under the umbrella of Project Virasat is among India's biggest government-sponsored craft revival programs.
Tourism and hospitality have recently become the backbone of local economy due to heavy tourist arrivals. Hundreds of small and some large hotels have sprung up to cater to the increased tourist inflow. Restaurants, taxi operators, local shopkeepers have all benefited from the tourist boom.

Transport

Air

Amritsar hosts Sri Guru Ramdasji International Airport. The airport is connected to other parts of India and other countries with direct international flights to cities. The Airport is 12th busiest Airport of India in terms of International Traffic. The Airport serves not only Amritsar, but also many other districts in Punjab and neighbouring states.

Rail

Amritsar Central Railway Station is the main station serving Amritsar. It is the busiest Railway Station in Indian State of Punjab and one of the highest revenue generating station of Northern Railways. Due to high traffic at the Amritsar Central Railway Station, Indian Railways has planned to develop 2 satellite stations-Chheharta and Bhagtanwala, in order to decongest traffic at this station. As many as 6 trains would be shifted to Chheharta Railway Station in the first phase. The Indian Railway Stations Development Corporation has also planned to make the Amritsar Central Railway Station, a world class railway station on lines of International Airport based on PPP Model. The project has received an overwhelming response with bids from 7 private firms, including GMR.

Road
Amritsar is located on the historic Grand Trunk Road (G.T Road), also known as NH 1 now renumbered as National Highway 3. An expressway by name of Delhi-Amritsar-Katra Expressway at the cost of 25,000 crore is approved under Bharatmala scheme which will cut the travel time from Amritsar to New Delhi by road from current 8 hours, to 4 hours. Another expressway, called Amritsar Jamnagar Expressway is under construction which will connect Amritsar to Jamnagar in Gujarat.
Additionally, NH 54 (Old NH15), NH 354 and NH 503A connect Amritsar to other parts of state and rest of India.
A ring road will also be built surrounding all 4 sides of Amritsar

 450,000,000 is being spent to expand the Amritsar-Jalandhar stretch of G.T. Road to four lanes. In 2010, elevated road with four lanes connected to the National highway for better access to the Golden Temple has been started.

Amritsar MetroBus

Amritsar has a bus rapid transit service, the Amritsar Metrobus which was launched on 28 January 2019. 93 fully air-conditioned Tata Marcopolo buses are used for the service connecting places like 
 Golden Temple
 Jallianwala Bagh
 Guru Nanak Dev University
 Golden Gate
 India Gate, Amritsar
 Durgiana Temple
 Khalsa College

Sister Cities

Following cities are Sister Cities of Amritsar:

Bakersfield, California, United States
Sandwell, West Midlands, England, United Kingdom
Thetford, Norfolk, England, United Kingdom

Educational institutions 

 BBK DAV College for Women, Amritsar
 D.A.V College
 Madaan Institute
 D.A.V Public School
 Delhi Public School, Amritsar
 Global Institute, Amritsar
 Government Medical College, Amritsar
 Guru Nanak Dev University
 Holy Heart Presidency School, Amritsar
 Khalsa College, Amritsar
 Khalsa College of Law
 Indian Institute of Management, Amritsar
 Spring Dale Senior School
 Shri Ram Ashram Public School
 Sri Guru Harkrishan Public School, Amritsar 
 St. Francis School, Amritsar
 St. Mary's Convent school, Chamiyari, Amritsar

Medical facilities 
 Dr. Vidyasagar Institute of Mental Health, a government mental hospital.
 Government Medical College, Amritsar
 Sri Guru Ram Das University of Health Sciences, Sri Amritsar
 Fortis Hospital, Byepass
 Amandeep Hospital, G. T. Road
 Medicity, Mall Road
 Dr. Daljit Singh Eye Hospital
 Dr. Om Parkash Eye Hospital

See also
 List of people from Amritsar
 Amritsar Ring Road
 Amritsar train disaster, a major accident that occurred during Dussehra 2018.
 Tarn Taran District
 Sports Facilities:
 Gandhi Sports Complex Ground, Cricket Stadium

Notes

References

Sources

External links 

 Official Website of District of Amritsar
 Official Website of Amritsar Municipal Corporation
 Amritsar HRIDAY city

 
Metropolitan cities in India
Cities and towns in Amritsar district
Former capital cities in India
Holy cities
Populated places along the Silk Road
Sikh places
Populated places established in 1574